Josef Bühler (16 February 1904 – 22 August 1948) was a state secretary and deputy governor to the Nazi Germany-controlled General Government in Kraków during World War II. He participated in the January 1942 Wannsee Conference, at which the genocidal Final Solution to the Jewish Question was planned.

Background 
Bühler was born in Bad Waldsee into a Catholic family.  His father was a baker. After obtaining his degree in law he received an appointment to work under Hans Frank, a legal advisor to Adolf Hitler and the Nazi Party. Bühler did not take up membership of the NSDAP until 1 April 1933, shortly after the Nazi rise to power.

Nazi career
Hans Frank was appointed Minister of Justice for Bavaria in 1933. Bühler became a member of the Nazi Party on 1 April 1933, according to his own testimony at the Nuremberg Trials, and was appointed administrator of the Court of Munich. In 1935 he became district chief attorney.

In 1938 Hans Frank, now Reich Minister without portfolio, put him in charge of his cabinet office. After the invasion of Poland by Nazi Germany in September 1939, Frank was appointed Governor-General for the occupied Polish territories and Bühler accompanied him to Kraków to take up the post of State Secretary of the General Government, also serving as Frank's deputy. He was given the honorary rank of SS-Brigadeführer by Reichsführer-SS Heinrich Himmler around this time.

Wannsee Conference and Final Solution
Bühler attended the Wannsee Conference on 20 January 1942 as the representative from the Governor General's office. During this conference, which discussed the imposition of the 'Final Solution of the Jewish Question in the German Sphere of Influence in Europe', Bühler stated to the other conference attendees the importance of solving 'the Jewish Question in the General Government as quickly as possible'.

Trial and execution 
After the war, Bühler testified on Frank's behalf at the Nuremberg Trials. He was later extradited to Poland and tried before the Supreme National Tribunal of Poland for crimes against humanity. Bühler was found guilty, sentenced to death, and ordered to forfeit all of his property on 10 July 1948. He was executed by hanging on 22 August at Montelupich Prison in Kraków.

In popular media 

Bühler played a major part in the 1992 alternate history Fatherland, written by Robert Harris. In the novel, Nazi Germany continued to fight the Soviet Union well into the 1960s and had hopes of building an alliance and ending its Cold War with the United States. Bühler continued to serve in the novel in the General Government until 1951, when he was wounded by Polish resistance and was forced to retire. The discovery of Bühler's corpse in the Havel at the beginning of the novel sparks the investigation by the protagonist, Xavier March, a major in the now peace-time SS police force. That investigation leads to the discovery of the Final Solution. It turns out that Bühler was murdered by the Gestapo during an attempt to cover all traces of the Final Solution, which Bühler had helped to instigate.

In the 2001 HBO film  Conspiracy, which portrayed the Wannsee Conference, Bühler was played by the British actor Ben Daniels.

Literature 
 Internationaler Militärgerichtshof Nürnberg (Hrsg.): Der Prozess gegen die Hauptkriegsverbrecher vor dem Internationalen Militärgerichtshof (14. November 1945 bis 1. Oktober 1946). Amtlicher Text in deutscher Sprache.
 Dr. Josef Buhler, Staatssekretär and Deputy Governor-General. Supreme National Tribunal of Poland (17TH JUNE-10TH JULY, 1948), Law-Reports of Trials of War Criminals, Selected and prepared by The United Nations War Crimes Commission, Volume XIV, London, HMSO. 1948 (englisch).  (PDF)
 Bogdan Musiał: Deutsche Zivilverwaltung und Judenverfolgung im Generalgouvernement. Harrassowitz, Wiesbaden 1999, ; 2. unveränderte Auflage, ebd. 2004, .
 Friedman, Towiah: Die höchsten Nazi-Beamten im General-Gouvernement in Polen in den Kriegs-Jahren 1939–45. Inst. of Documentation in Israel for the Investigation of Nazi War Crimes, Haifa 2002
 Grimm, Hans: Dr. Josef Bühler – Impusgeber bei der Wannsee-Konferenz. In: Wolfgang Praske: Täter Helfer Trittbrettfahrer. Band 4. NS-Belastete aus Oberschwaben. Kugelberg Verlag, Gerstetten 2015, p. 70–83

References 

 Short biography, House of the Wannsee Conference Memorial Site
 Transcript, Bühler's testimony at the Nuremberg Trials, IMT Proceedings vol. 12, pp. 64–113
 Summary, the trial against Bühler, Law Report, United Nations War Crimes Commission, 1949
 Videoclip, Part I, Bühler testifying at the Nuremberg Trials (in German)
 Videoclip, Part II, Bühler testifying at the Nuremberg Trials (in German)
 

1904 births
1948 deaths
People from Bad Waldsee
People from the Kingdom of Württemberg
Nazi Party politicians
Members of the Reichstag of Nazi Germany
Holocaust perpetrators in Poland
German people convicted of crimes against humanity
Executed people from Baden-Württemberg
SS-Brigadeführer
Lawyers in the Nazi Party
20th-century German lawyers
General Government
Executions by the Supreme National Tribunal
People extradited to Poland